The Crooks fluctuation theorem (CFT), sometimes known as the Crooks equation, is an equation in statistical mechanics that relates the work done on a system during a non-equilibrium transformation to the free energy difference between the final and the initial state of the transformation. During the non-equilibrium transformation the system is at constant volume and in contact with a heat reservoir. The CFT is named after the chemist Gavin E. Crooks (then at University of California, Berkeley) who discovered it in 1998.

The most general statement of the CFT relates the probability of a space-time trajectory  to the time-reversal of the trajectory . The theorem says if the dynamics of the system satisfies microscopic reversibility, then the forward time trajectory is exponentially more likely than the reverse, given that it produces entropy,

 

If one defines a generic reaction coordinate of the system as a function of the Cartesian coordinates of the constituent particles ( e.g. , a distance between two particles), one can characterize every point along the reaction coordinate path by a parameter , such that  and  correspond to two ensembles of  microstates for which the reaction coordinate is constrained to different values. A dynamical process where  is externally driven from zero to one, according to an arbitrary time scheduling, will be referred as  forward transformation , while the time reversal path will be indicated as backward transformation. Given these definitions, the CFT sets a relation between the following five quantities:
 , where  is the Boltzmann constant and  the temperature of the reservoir;

The CFT equation reads as follows:

 

In the previous equation the difference  corresponds to the work dissipated in the forward transformation, . The probabilities  and   become identical when the transformation is performed at infinitely slow speed,  i.e.  for equilibrium transformations. In such cases,  and 

 

Note that for the backward transformation, the work distribution function must be evaluated by taking the work with the opposite sign. This phenomenon has been experimentally verified using optical tweezers for the
process of unfolding and refolding of a small RNA hairpin and an RNA three-helix junction.

The CFT implies the Jarzynski equality.

Notes

Non-equilibrium thermodynamics
Statistical mechanics theorems